Diego Emilio Martínez Soto (born 22 September 1988) is a Mexican professional footballer who plays as a midfielder.

Honours
Atlante
Campeón de Campeones: 2022

External links
 
 

Living people
1988 births
Footballers from Mexico City
Mexican footballers
Association football midfielders
Liga MX players
Atlético Morelia players
Club Atlético Zacatepec players
Potros UAEM footballers
Tampico Madero F.C. footballers
Alebrijes de Oaxaca players
Tecamachalco F.C. footballers